The 1985 NCAA Division I Indoor Track and Field Championships were contested March 8−9, 1985 at the Carrier Dome at Syracuse University in Syracuse, New York to determine the individual and team national champions of men's and women's NCAA collegiate indoor track and field events in the United States. These were the 21st annual men's championships and the 3rd annual women's championships.

On the men's side, defending champions Arkansas claimed the team title, the Razorbacks' second. This would ultimately be the second of twelve straight titles for Arkansas. For the women, Florida State topped the team standings, claiming the Seminoles' first title. 

This was the first championship held only for Division I programs. The inaugural Division II championship (for men and women) was held at North Dakota State University in Fargo, North Dakota while the Division III event (also for men and women) was hosted by Bates College in Lewiston, Maine.

Qualification
With the establishment of separate championships for Division II and III for the 1984–85 season, only athletes from Division I indoor track and field programs were eligible to compete for this year's individual and team titles.

Team standings 
 Note: Top 10 only
 Scoring: 6 points for a 1st-place finish in an event, 4 points for 2nd, 3 points for 3rd, 2 points for 4th, and 1 point for 5th
 (DC) = Defending Champions
 Full results

Men's title

Women's title

References

NCAA Indoor Track and Field Championships
Ncaa Indoor Track And Field Championships
Ncaa Indoor Track And Field Championships
NCAA Indoor Track and Field Championships